Vermillion County lies in the western part of the U.S. state of Indiana between the Illinois border and the Wabash River. As of the 2010 census, the population was 16,212. The county seat is Newport. It was officially established in 1824 and was the fiftieth Indiana county created. Vermillion County is included in the Terre Haute, Indiana, Metropolitan Statistical Area. The county contains seven incorporated towns with a total population of about 9,900. as well as several unincorporated communities; it is also divided into five townships which provide local services. An interstate highway, two U.S. routes, and five state roads cross the county, as does a major railroad line.

History
The first settlers in the area arrived in 1816, the same year that the state of Indiana was established. Vigo County was formed in 1818 and included the area that later became Parke and Vermillion counties. In 1821, Parke County was formed, and on January 2, 1824, the Indiana General Assembly created Vermillion County out of Parke County; the act took effect on February 1. The county seat was established at Newport later that year.

The county was named for the southbound Vermilion River, which flows nearby. The name is spelled in the French/Commonwealth English style with a double letter "l", in contrast to the American English spelling of the adjacent Vermilion County, Illinois. This is one of only a few cases in the United States in which a county borders a county with the same name in another state.

The first courthouse was a frame building. The contract was awarded in June 1824 for $345 and was to be completed by the following November; it was used for county business until a brick building could be constructed. The brick courthouse was contracted in 1831; the completed building was used until January 29, 1844, when the building caught fire. It was repaired and served until 1868 when a third courthouse was built at a cost of $30,000; a west wing was added in 1903 at a cost of $28,000. That building was struck by lightning early on the morning of May 27, 1923, and was largely destroyed by fire. Construction on the fourth (and current) courthouse began that same year; Halbert Fillinger and John Bayard were the architects. The stone building was constructed by Jasper Good of Columbus at a cost of $358,707, and the new courthouse was dedicated on June 11, 1925.

The Newport Hill Climb was first held in 1909. The event was started and stopped several times over the years, but the Newport Lions Club now runs the Newport Antique Auto Hill Climb; it has been held continuously since the 1960s and involves several hundred cars each year.

On January 26, 2017, the wooden grandstand at the Vermillion County Fairgrounds was destroyed by a massive fire. The wooden grandstand was built in 1933 as a WPA work project, and was the oldest wooden grandstand in Indiana. The Cayuga Fire Department said that the cause of the fire is suspicious.

Geography

It shares a  border with Warren County to the north. Its eastern border is defined by the Wabash River. Fountain and Parke counties lie across the river to the northeast and southeast, respectively. Vermillion County is the southernmost county in Indiana entirely on the right bank of the Wabash. Vigo County, from which Parke and Vermillion counties were formed, lies to the south. The county's western border is shared with the state of Illinois. To the northwest lies Vermilion County, Illinois; its county seat, Danville, is west of the northern border of Vermillion County. To the southwest is Edgar County; its county seat, Paris, is west of Vermillion County's southern border.

The Vermillion River, for which the county was named, enters from Illinois to the west and crosses the county to empty into the Wabash River near Cayuga.

At a meeting of the board of commissioners on March 23, 1824 (the same year the county was formed), four townships were created: Clinton, Helt, Highland, and Vermillion. Later, Eugene Township was created out of portions of Highland and Vermillion; the north end of Highland Township became part of Warren County.

There are seven incorporated towns in Vermillion County. Cayuga is located near the confluence of the Vermillion and Wabash rivers, along State Road 63 just west of its intersection with State Road 234. Clinton is the largest settlement in the county with a population of about 5100, and lies further to the south along the Wabash River, between it and State Road 63; State Road 163 passes through the town to reach U.S. Route 41 on the east side of the river. Fairview Park is just north of Clinton; State Road 63 passes through the north end of the town. Dana is a small town just north of the intersection of U.S. Route 36 and State Road 71. Newport is located just east of State Road 63, a few miles south of Cayuga; it is the county seat, although it is one of the smallest towns in the county. Perrysville is also located along the Wabash River, on State Road 32 just east of its intersection with State Road 63. Universal is in the far southern part of the county, west of State Road 63.

In addition to the towns, there are also many unincorporated communities. Helt Township has more than any other township and includes the communities of Alta, Bono, Highland, Hillsdale, Jonestown, Saint Bernice, and Summit Grove. Clinton Township contains Blanford, Centenary, Klondyke, and Syndicate. Highland Township includes Flat Iron, Gessie, Rileysburg, and Tree Spring. Eugene Township, which contains Cayuga, has just one unincorporated community: Eugene, which is just north of Cayuga.

At least three other communities once existed in Vermillion County but have since become extinct: Quaker, Randall, and Toronto.

Climate

Vermillion County is in the humid continental climate region of the United States along with most of Indiana. Its Köppen climate classification is Dfa, meaning that it is cold, has no dry season, and has a hot summer. Average monthly precipitation ranged from  inches in February to  inches in June.

Transportation
 passes from east to west through the north end of the county; U.S. Route 136 does so as well, about  further to the north. U.S. Route 36 crosses the south part of the county on its way from Rockville to Chrisman, Illinois, passing just south of Dana.

 runs from the state line through Perrysville and continues east toward Crawfordsville.  runs the length of the county from north to south on its way to Terre Haute in the south;  begins at State Road 63 near Newport and runs southwest, then south through Dana and Bono before ending at Blanford. There,  runs east through Clinton to join U.S. Route 41 on the east side of the Wabash River.  runs from the Indiana border through Cayuga, continuing east through Kingman in Fountain County.

CSX Transportation operates a railroad line running from Danville, Illinois to Terre Haute. This line runs most of the length of Vermillion County from north to south, passing through Rilesyburg, Cayuga, and Clinton before crossing the Wabash River. Another CSX line coming from Decatur, Illinois, enters the county from the west and meets the north–south line near Hillsdale. The  Vermilion Valley Railroad passes through the very north edge of the county on its way from the Flex-N-Gate factory west of Covington to Danville, Illinois.

Airport
The county has a three Small airports, the Clinton Airport, located in Clinton, Gessie Airport located in Gessie, and Universal Heli Port located in Universal.

Economy
Vermillion County's economy is supported by a labor force of approximately 7,924 workers with an unemployment rate in December 2010 of 12.5%. Government jobs make up 13% of the county's employment. Manufacturing accounts for 12.4%, and construction 10%, while 8.5% of the county's jobs relate to farming.

Private employment by company
The largest private employers in Vermillion County as of 2017 are as follows. This list
excludes franchises, retail, and majority part-time employers.

Education and health care
The administration of public schools in Vermillion County is divided between two entities. The North Vermillion Community School Corporation administers North Vermillion Junior-Senior High School and North Vermillion Elementary School, both located just north of Cayuga along State Road 63. The South Vermillion Community School Corporation administers schools located in Clinton, including South Vermillion High School, South Vermillion Middle School, and three elementary schools: Central, Ernie Pyle, and Van Duyn. It also manages the Parke Vermillion Education and Training Interlocal (PVETI) in Hillsdale.

There are no colleges or universities within Vermillion County, but there are several nearby. Rose–Hulman Institute of Technology, a smaller private college also in Terre Haute, specializes in teaching engineering, mathematics, and science. Ivy Tech Community College of Indiana has 23 campuses throughout the state; the nearest to Vermillion County is in Terre Haute.

The Vermillion County Public Library has branches in Cayuga, Newport, and Dana. In 1909 a Carnegie library was built in Clinton; it was expanded in 1947 and in 1953. In the early 1990s it was determined that an entirely new building was needed, and this was completed in 1994.

Union Hospital, located in Terre Haute to the south, operates a hospital in Clinton.

Notable people

Henry Dana Washburn was born in Vermont in 1832; in 1850 he moved to Vermillion County, studied law, and opened a practice in Newport in 1853. He served in the Civil War on the Union side as a lieutenant colonel and later as a general; after the war he was elected to the United States House of Representatives and served through 1869. In 1870 he headed an expedition which explored the area that later became Yellowstone National Park. He died 1871 in Clinton and is buried at Riverside Cemetery.

Claude Matthews was the governor of Indiana from 1893 to 1897. He was born in Kentucky in 1845; he moved to Vermillion County in 1867 and became a prominent farmer. He was elected Indiana Secretary of State in 1890, and governor in 1893. He died in 1898 in Indianapolis and is buried in Clinton; he was 52 years old.

Ernie Pyle was born on a farm near Dana in 1900. He served for three months in the United States Navy Reserve at the end of World War I; after the war he attended Indiana University but left before graduating to take a newspaper job. He served for several years as the managing editor at the Washington Daily News, and later became the nation's first aviation columnist. He began as a roving correspondent in 1935, and became a war correspondent when the United States entered World War II. His work during the war earned him a Pulitzer Prize. He died in combat in 1945.

Ken Kercheval was born in Clinton in 1935 and became an actor in 1962; he is best known for his role as "Cliff Barnes" in the television series Dallas.

Dana Lewman lived in Vermillion County until she was six. She is best known for the Breaking Good podcast. The five-part series chronicles her early life and teenage summers in various towns within the county, including Dana and Clinton.

Government

The county government is a constitutional body granted specific powers by the Constitution of Indiana and the Indiana Code. The county council is the legislative branch of the county government and controls all spending and revenue collection. Representatives are elected from county districts. The council members serve four-year terms and are responsible for setting salaries, the annual budget and special spending. The council also has limited authority to impose local taxes, in the form of an income and property tax that is subject to state level approval, excise taxes and service taxes.

The executive body of the county is made of a board of commissioners. The commissioners are elected county-wide, in staggered terms, and each serves a four-year term. One of the commissioners, typically the most senior, serves as president. The commissioners are charged with executing the acts legislated by the council, collecting revenue and managing day-to-day functions of the county government.

Vermillion Circuit Court serves as the court of general jurisdiction. It hears civil cases, criminal felonies, and some misdemeanors and infractions. Clinton maintains a city court that can hear misdemeanors and infractions.

The county has several other elected offices, including sheriff, coroner, auditor, treasurer, recorder, surveyor and circuit court clerk. Each of these elected officers serves a term of four years and oversees a different part of county government. Members elected to county government positions are required to declare party affiliations and be residents of the county.

Each of the townships has a trustee who administers rural fire protection and ambulance service, provides poor relief and manages cemetery care, among other duties. The trustee is assisted in these duties by a three-member township board. The trustees and board members are elected to four-year terms.

Based on 2000 census results, Vermillion County is part of Indiana's 8th congressional district, the 38th Indiana Senate district, and the 42nd Indiana House of Representatives district.

Communities

Townships 
 Clinton
 Eugene
 Helt
 Highland
 Vermillion

Cities and Towns 
 Cayuga
 Clinton
 Dana
 Fairview Park
 Newport
 Perrysville
 Universal

Census-Designated Places 
 Blanford
 Saint Bernice

Demographics

As of the 2010 United States Census, there were 16,212 people, 6,619 households, and 4,533 families residing in the county. The racial makeup of the county was 98.3% white, 0.2% Asian, 0.2% American Indian, 0.1% black or African American, 0.3% from other races, and 0.8% from two or more races. Those of Hispanic or Latino origin made up 0.8% of the population. In terms of ancestry, 24.7% were American, 19.5% were German, 11.0% were Irish, 9.8% were English, and 7.9% were Italian.

Of the 6,619 households, 30.6% had children under the age of 18 living with them, 52.7% were married couples living together, 11.0% had a female householder with no husband present, 31.5% were non-families, and 27.3% of all households were made up of individuals. The average household size was 2.42 and the average family size was 2.90. The median age was 41.9 years.

The median income for a household in the county was $47,697 and the median income for a family was $50,743. Males had a median income of $41,620 versus $30,168 for females. The per capita income for the county was $22,178. About 11.8% of families and 14.7% of the population were below the poverty line, including 21.9% of those under age 18 and 13.2% of those age 65 or over.

List of Sheriffs

 Parties

See also
 National Register of Historic Places listings in Vermillion County, Indiana
 Western Indiana Community Foundation

Notes

References

Bibliography

External links
 Access Vermillion County
 Newport Antique Auto Hill Climb

 
Indiana counties
1824 establishments in Indiana
Populated places established in 1824
Terre Haute metropolitan area
Sundown towns in Indiana